Hilde Synnøve Riis (born 6 May 1959) is a Norwegian cross-country skier. She was born in Lørenskog, and represented the club Sylling IF. She competed at the 1980 Winter Olympics in Lake Placid, where she placed 30th in the 10 km.

Cross-country skiing results

Olympic Games

References

External links

1959 births
Living people
People from Lørenskog
Norwegian female cross-country skiers
Olympic cross-country skiers of Norway
Cross-country skiers at the 1980 Winter Olympics
Sportspeople from Viken (county)